Abul Islam (1924 – 20 February 2004) was a Bangladeshi freedom fighter and politician from Jessore belonging to Bangladesh Awami League. He was a member of the Jatiya Sangsad. He was known as Sabas Chairman.

Biography
Islam was born on 1924 at Hajirbag in Jhikargacha of Jessore. He was elected as the chairman of the then Balla Union Parishad in 1958.

In 1964 Ayub Khan introduced basic democracy system. Islam sent a letter to the office of the president and speaker in which he criticised it. He was the only chairman who directly criticised the system. After this incident The Daily Ittefaq published a news article about him titled Sabas Chairman. Later, he received "Sabas Chairman" title from Sheikh Mujibur Rahman.

Islam was elected as a member of the East Pakistan Provincial Assembly in 1970. He took part in the Liberation War of Bangladesh in 1971. After the Liberation of Bangladesh he was appointed as a member of the Constituent Assembly of Bangladesh. Later, he was elected as a member of the Jatiya Sangsad from Jessore-6 in 1973.

Islam died on 20 February 2004.

References

1924 births
2004 deaths
People from Jessore District
1st Jatiya Sangsad members
Awami League politicians
People of the Bangladesh Liberation War